Ireland was represented by Chris Doran and the song "If My World Stopped Turning" in the Eurovision Song Contest 2004.

Before Eurovision

You're a Star 

RTÉ used the You're a Star talent contest to select the Irish entry for the Eurovision. The competition started on 16 November 2003. Thirteen artists participated in the finals, which ended on 6 and 7 March 2004. Ten out of 13 finalists were chosen through regional audition heats and the jury gave wildcards to the remaining three. The finals started on Sunday 18 January 2003 and each week one artist had to leave the competition. The 13 finalists were:

 Chris Doran
 Cladach
 Colin Fahy
 Final Four
 Gary O'Malley
 Gary Philbin
 George Murphy
 James Kilbane
 Jean Elliot
 Laura Brophy
 Philip Noone
 Phil Coulter and Gill Blacque
 Ruth Cullen

Final 
The final was held on 6 March 2004 at the Helix Centre in Dublin, hosted by Ray D'arcy. The winner was chosen by televoting, with the result being announced on 7 March 2004.

At Eurovision
For the Eurovision Song Contest 2004, a semi-final round was introduced in order to accommodate the influx of nations that wanted to compete in the contest. Since Ireland placed 11th in the previous contest year, country automatically qualified to compete in the final along with the Big Four countries and nine other nations that were also successful in the 2003 Contest. He performed 18th, following Iceland and preceding Poland. Chris Doran gave a simple and subtle presentation of the song, but the typical Irish ballad did not deliver a good result for Ireland. Chris and the back-up singers were dressed in white, which was a popular colour among the participants in 2004. Chris only managed to gain 7 points, all from Ireland's neighbour United Kingdom, placing him 22nd. As Ireland failed to reach the top 12 in the final, the country was forced to compete in the semi-final of the 2005 Contest.

Voting

Points awarded to Ireland

Points awarded by Ireland

References

2004
Countries in the Eurovision Song Contest 2004
Eurovision
Eurovision